Scali may refer to:

 Scali bread, an Italian style of bread made predominantly in the area of Boston, Massachusetts, U.S.
 Scali family, one of the three leading Florentine banking families in the Middle Ages

See also
Scala (disambiguation)
Scale (disambiguation)